Sanae Agalmam is a Moroccan karateka. She represented Morocco at the 2019 African Games and she won the gold medal in the women's individual kata event. She also won the gold medal in the women's team kata event.

Career 

In 2018, she competed in the women's individual kata event at the World Karate Championships held in Madrid, Spain.

She represented Morocco at the 2019 African Beach Games held in Sal, Cape Verde where she won the gold medal both in the women's individual and women's team kata events. She also won the gold medal in the women's individual kata and women's team kata events at the 2019 African Karate Championships. At the 2018 African Karate Championships, she won the silver medal in the  women's individual kata event.

In June 2021, she competed at the World Olympic Qualification Tournament held in Paris, France hoping to qualify for the 2020 Summer Olympics in Tokyo, Japan. In October 2021, she won the silver medal in her event at the 2021 Mediterranean Karate Championships held in Limassol, Cyprus.

She won the gold medal in the women's team kata event at the 2021 Islamic Solidarity Games held in Konya, Turkey.

References

External links 
 

Living people
Year of birth missing (living people)
Place of birth missing (living people)
Moroccan female karateka
Competitors at the 2019 African Games
African Games medalists in karate
African Games gold medalists for Morocco
Islamic Solidarity Games medalists in karate
Islamic Solidarity Games competitors for Morocco
21st-century Moroccan women